Huberia is a genus of flowering plants belonging to the family Melastomataceae.

Its native range is from Ecuador to Peru, eastern and southern Brazil.

General description
Most are shrubs, the leaves are opposite (arranged), petiolate (has a leaf stalk) and are serrated. It flowers with 3 flowered cymes which have a long stipitate (stalk). The flowers are similar in form to Meriania species, but tetramerous (in four parts). The receptacle (the axis of a flower) is urceolate (shaped like an urn or pitcher) or lageniform (flask-shaped) and narrowed to the neck, sometimes costate alate (ribbed like a wing). The flower has 4 sepals which are broad, and 4 petals which are longer then the calyx and much contorted.
It has 8 stamens, which have a dorsal appendage which is less developed. The anthers are incurved and elongated. 
It has a seed capsule that is 4-valved. The seeds are sometimes imbricate (tiled and overlapping), produced on both sides to an elongated wing.
The seeds are also winged and pyramidal (in form).

Taxonomy
The genus name of Huberia is in honour of François Huber (1750–1831) a Swiss entomologist who specialized in honey bees, and also his son Jean Pierre Huber. Augustin Pyramus de Candolle was a close friend of Huber and wrote a biographer of him in 1832.
The genus was first described and published in Prodr. Vol.3 on page 167 in 1828.

Known species
According to Kew:

The type species, Huberia semiserrata  is listed by the United States Department of Agriculture and the Agricultural Research Service on 21 March 2005.

References

Other sources
 Applequist, W. L. 2014. Report of the Nomenclature Committee for Vascular Plants: 66. Taxon 63:1370. Note: should be treated as earlier homonym of Hubera Chaowasku
 Baumgratz, J. F. A. 2004. Sinopse de Huberia DC. (Melastomataceae:Merianieae). Revista Brasil. Bot. 27(3):545–561.
 Chaowasku, T. 2013. (7) Request for a binding decision on whether Huberia DC. (Melastomataceae) and Hubera Chaowasku (Annonaceae) are sufficiently alike to be confused. Taxon 62:412.

Melastomataceae
Melastomataceae genera
Plants described in 1828
Flora of Ecuador
Flora of Peru
Flora of Brazil